This list is of the Cultural Properties of Japan designated in the category of  for the Prefecture of Shizuoka.

National Cultural Properties
As of 1 February 2015, three Important Cultural Properties have been designated, being of national significance.

Prefectural Cultural Properties
As of 1 December 2013, two properties have been designated at a prefectural level.

Municipal Cultural Properties
Properties designated at a municipal level include:

See also
 Cultural Properties of Japan
 List of National Treasures of Japan (historical materials)
 List of Historic Sites of Japan (Shizuoka)
 Tōtōmi, Suruga and Izu Provinces

References

External links
  Cultural Properties in Shizuoka Prefecture

Cultural Properties,historical materials
Historical materials,Shizuoka